Francis Victor Gleeson (25 September 1897 – 12 June 1923) was an Australian rules footballer who played with St Kilda in the Victorian Football League (VFL).

Notes

External links 

1897 births
1923 deaths
Australian rules footballers from Victoria (Australia)
St Kilda Football Club players
Castlemaine Football Club players